The Cap-des-Rosiers Lighthouse is a lighthouse near the village of  in Gaspé, Quebec, Canada.

It was classified as a National Historic Site of Canada on June 11, 1973. It was listed as a Federal Heritage Building on March 31, 1994.

It is situated on the south shore of the Saint Lawrence River at the top of a steep cliff. It is located at the mouth of the river, where it flows into the Gulf of St. Lawrence. It is open for tours in the summer season.

Historic Sites and Monuments Board of Canada
The Historic Sites and Monuments Board of Canada installed a plaque at the base of the lighthouse in 1977, with inscriptions in French and English, which reads (in English):

Built in 1858, this lighthouse is one of a series of tall, tapering towers erected on the Gulf of St. Lawrence and on Lake Huron by the Department of Public Works. The 112 foot structure is the tallest lighthouse in Canada; its stone tower faced with firebrick has walls over seven feet thick at the base, tapering to three feet at the top, with foundations extending to eight feet beneath the surface. Originally a dwelling was attached to the tower. A powerful light 136 feet above high water served as a major coastal aid for shipping headed in the estuary of the St. Lawrence from the Gulf.

Keepers
 Eugène Trudeau 1856-1867
 Auguste Trudeau 1867-1886 
 Jean B. Vien 1886-1890 
 Eugène Costin 1890-1915 
 P. E. Theriault 1915-1920 
 J. Napoléon Côté 1920-1927 
 J. Ferguson 1927-1931 
 J. Napoléon Côté 1931-1935 
 Joseph Ferguson 1935-1951 
 Joseph-Narcisse Rioux 1951-1970 
 Yves Packwood 1970-1971 
 Owen Gleeton 1971-1972 
 Paul-Roger Caron 1972-1978 
 Yvon Élément 1978-1981

See also
List of lighthouses in Canada

Gallery

References

External links
 Cap-des-Rosiers Lighthouse Official website
 Aids to Navigation Canadian Coast Guard

Lighthouses completed in 1858
National Historic Sites in Quebec
Lighthouses in Quebec
Buildings and structures in Gaspésie–Îles-de-la-Madeleine
Buildings and structures in Gaspé, Quebec
Lighthouses on the National Historic Sites of Canada register
Museums in Gaspésie–Îles-de-la-Madeleine
Lighthouse museums in Canada
1858 establishments in Canada